Scabricola is a genus of sea snails, marine gastropod mollusks in the family Mitridae.

Species
Species within the genus Scabricola include:

Species brought into synonymy
 Scabricola biconica Bozzetti, 2011 accepted as Swainsonia biconica (Bozzetti, 2011) (original combination)
 Scabricola casta (Gmelin, 1791): synonym of Swainsonia casta (Gmelin, 1791) 
 Scabricola fissurata (Lamarck, 1811): synonym of Swainsonia fissurata (Lamarck, 1811) 
 Scabricola fusca (Swainson, 1824): synonym of Swainsonia fusca (Swainson, 1824) 
 Scabricola gorii: synonym of Pterygia gorii (Turner, 2007)
 Scabricola granatina: synonym of Domiporta granatina (Lamarck, 1811)
 Scabricola interlirata (Reeve, 1844) accepted as Imbricaria interlirata (Reeve, 1844)
 Scabricola lugubris (Swainson, 1821) accepted as Strigatella lugubris (Swainson, 1821)
 Scabricola juttinga Koperberg, 1931: synonym of Gemmulimitra duplilirata (Reeve, 1845) 
 Scabricola newcombii (Pease, 1869): synonym of Swainsonia newcombii (Pease, 1869) 
 Scabricola ocellata (Swainson, 1831): synonym of Swainsonia ocellata (Swainson, 1831)
 Scabricola scabriuscula: synonym of Neocancilla papilio (Link, 1807)

References

External links
 Swainson, W. (1840). A treatise on malacology or shells and shell-fish. London, Longman. viii + 419 pp
 Fedosov A., Puillandre N., Herrmann M., Kantor Yu., Oliverio M., Dgebuadze P., Modica M.V. & Bouchet P. (2018). The collapse of Mitra: molecular systematics and morphology of the Mitridae (Gastropoda: Neogastropoda). Zoological Journal of the Linnean Society. 183(2): 253-337

 
Mitridae
Gastropod genera